Empress (Dowager) Liang the Junior (小梁太后, died 1099), posthumously titled Empress Zhaojian Wenmu (昭簡文穆皇后), was an empress regent of the Western Xia. She was a member of the Liang clan, but her personal name is not known. She was married to Emperor Huizong of Western Xia, and was regent from 1086 to 1099 during the minority of her son, Emperor Chongzong of Western Xia.

References 

 
 

11th-century births
1099 deaths
11th-century women rulers
11th-century Tangut women
Western Xia empresses
Regents of China
Deaths from food poisoning
Murdered royalty